Yoho lake is a lake located in New Brunswick, Canada. It is near the capital, Fredericton, and to the village of Hanwell.

Wildlife
Fish found in the lake include: Yellow Perch, Rainbow Trout, Atlantic Salmon, Striped bass, Smallmouth bass, redbreast sunfish, of which it is the most northern source worldwide, and many others. It is known for having an abundance of Common Loons.

Cyanobacteria outbreaks 
In 2020, a blue-green algae bloom was discovered in the lake. It is unknown if any toxins were produced, but since then, two smaller ones had happened. The first 2020 one was also relatively small, compared to the effects in other lakes in the region.

References 

Lakes of New Brunswick
Landforms of York County, New Brunswick